Rancho San José Airstrip is a private dirt airstrip located in Rancho San José, better known as Meling Ranch,  Municipality of Ensenada, Baja California, Mexico, 32 miles to the east of  Federal Highway 1,   near the West side of the San Pedro Mártir Mountain Range. The airstrip is operated by the Meling Family, which also run the Guest Ranch. The airstrip is used solely for general aviation  purposes.

External links
Meling Guest Ranch Official Page.
Baja Bush Pilots forum about Meling Ranch Airstrip.
Visit to Meling Ranch.
Sidetrip to Meling Ranch.
Meling Ranch Promo.
MLR photo.

Airports in Baja California